The Mtatsminda Pantheon of Writers and Public Figures (mtats'mindis mts'eralta da sazogado moghvats'eta p'anteoni) is a necropolis in Tbilisi, Georgia, where some of the most prominent writers, artists, scholars, and national heroes of Georgia are buried. It is located in the churchyard around St David’s Church "Mamadaviti" on the slope of Mount Mtatsminda (Geo. მთაწმინდა, meaning the Holy Mountain) and was officially established in 1929. Atop the mountain is Mtatsminda Park, an amusement park owned by the municipality of Tbilisi.

The first celebrities to be buried at this place were the Russian writer Alexander Griboyedov  (1795–1829) and his Georgian wife Nino Chavchavadze (1812–1857). The Pantheon was officially opened in 1929 to mark the centenary of Griboyedov's death during his time as the Russian ambassador. The Pantheon was conceived of as a symbol of collective identity of Georgia. Since then, several illustrious Georgians have been buried or reburied there. The Pantheon is administered by the Government of Tbilisi and is frequented by locals as well as the city’s visitors.

History

Origins 
The earliest attempt to create a Pantheon in Tbilisi was the Pantheon of Kukia, which the Dramaturgical Society of Georgia began work on to honor its artists by 1900, but which had disappeared by the 1950s. Later, the Society for Spreading Literacy Among Georgians managed to established the Didube Pantheon in 1915. In 1929, the Government of the Soviet Union, which controlled Georgia at the time, established another pantheon on a former cemetery near the Mtatsminda Church; its opening was dedicated to the 100-year anniversary of the Alexander Griboyedov, who was buried there in 1829 with his wife (and whose grave had a sculpture of a mourning woman on it).

Under Soviet rule, the Didube Pantheon was nearly abolished in the 1930s. There was an order issued in 1934 to remove unknown or unimportant tombs from Mtatsminda and to transfer some distinguished people, including Nikoloz Baratashvili and Vazha-Pshavela from Didube to Mtatsminda; this order marked the fall of Didube's status and the rise of Mtatsminda's. In 1937, the pantheon's administration adopted regulations indicating that the decision-making council should consist mainly of government official, party members, and Georgian scholars. Because of the totalitarian system, it was easy to create the impression that the Mtatsminda Pantheon was the most desirable place of rest for Georgians, an impression which still persisted in 2014.

New pantheon 
In 2009, Tbilisi City Hall announced that the old Mtatsminda Pantheon had no more space and that there were ongoing consultations about a new one with the Patriarch of Georgia. In October 2009, the vice-mayor of Tbilisi declared, "a new place has to be selected, where a church can be erected and public funerals can be held. It is important to build the new pantheon at an especially good location, accessible for society and approved by society". However, since the official closure of the old site, there have been exceptions: Mukhran Machavariani was buried there in 2010 and Chabua Amirejibi was buried there in 2013 (the latter of which caused controversy).

As of 2014, there are three Pantheons in Tbilisi under city hall supervision, which are Mtatsminda Pantheon, Didube Pantheon, and Khojivank Pantheon (the last of which is Armenian).

List of burials 

Vaso Abashidze (1854–1926), Georgian theater actor and director 
Veriko Anjaparidze (1897–1987), Georgian theater and movie actress
Nikoloz Baratashvili (1817–1845), Georgian romanticist poet
Vasil Barnovi (1856–1934), Georgian novelist
Nikoloz Berdzenishvili (1894–1965), Georgian historian
Vakhtang Chabukiani (1910–1992), Georgian ballet dancer
Ilia Chavchavadze (Saint Ilia the Righteous) (1837–1907), Georgian writer and public figure; and his wife Olgha Guramishvili (1842–1927) 
Zakaria Chichinadze (1853–1931), Georgian amateur historian and publisher
Simon Chikovani (1902–1966), Georgian poet and public figure
Otar Chiladze (1933–2009), Georgian writer
Kakutsa Cholokashvili (1888–1930), Georgian national hero and fighter against the Soviet regime
Shalva Dadiani (1874–1959), Georgian playwright and actor
Nodar Dumbadze (1928–1984), Georgian writer
 (1847–1890), Georgian journalist, translator and playwright
Zviad Gamsakhurdia (1939–1993), Soviet-era dissident and the first democratically elected President of Georgia 
Keke Geladze (1858–1937), mother of Joseph Stalin
Iakob Gogebashvili (1840–1912), Georgian writer and educator
Alexander Griboyedov (1795–1829), Russian writer; and his wife Nino Chavchavadze (1812–1857)
Ioseb Grishashvili (1889–1965), Georgian writer, poet and scholar
Lado Gudiashvili (1896–1980), Georgian painter
Olga Guramishvili-Nikoladze (1855–1940), Georgian educator
Simon Janashia (1900–1947), Georgian historian
Mose Janashvili (1855–1934), Georgian historian
Ana Kalandadze (1924–2008), Georgian poet
Akaki Khorava (1895–1972), Georgian actor
Leo Kiacheli (1884–1963), Georgian writer
Dimitri Kipiani (1814–1887), Georgian journalist and public figure
Davit Kldiashvili (1862–1931), Georgian writer
Merab Kostava (1939–1989), Soviet-era dissident and national hero of Georgia
Giorgi Leonidze (1899–1966), Georgian poet
Kote Marjanishvili (1872–1933), Georgian theatre director
Nikoloz Muskhelishvili (1891–1976), Georgian mathematician
Niko Nikoladze (1843–1928), Georgian journalist and public benefactor
Iakob Nikoladze (1876–1951), Georgian sculptor
 (1868–1934), Georgian conductor
Galaktion Tabidze (1892–1959), Georgian poet
Ekvtime Takaishvili (1862–1953), Georgian historian and archaeologist  
 (1844–1929), Georgian linguist
Akaki Tsereteli (1840–1915), Georgian poet
Grigol Tsereteli (1870–1938), Georgian papyrologist
Mikhail Tskhakaya (1865–1950), Georgian communist
Anastasia Tumanishvili-Tsereteli (1849–1932), Georgian woman writer
Vazha-Pshavela (1861–1915), Georgian poet
Ilia Vekua (1907–1977), Georgian mathematician
Sergo Zakariadze (1909–1971), Georgian actor
Solomon Dodashvili (1805–1836), Georgian philosopher, journalist, historian, grammarian, belletrist and enlightener
Chabua Amirejibi (1921–2013), Georgian novelist and Soviet-era dissident
Niko Pirosmani (1862–1918), Georgian artist
Jansug Charkviani (1931–2017), Georgian poet
Giorgi Kvinitadze (1874–1970), Georgian general

See also 
 Didube Pantheon
 Saburtalo Pantheon
 List of cemeteries in Georgia (country)

References

External links 
 Mtatsminda Pantheon website
 მთაწმინდის პანთეონი (Mtatsminda Pantheon) – 2005

Cemeteries in Georgia (country)
Eastern Orthodox cemeteries
Monuments and memorials in Tbilisi
Buildings and structures in Tbilisi
Eastern Orthodoxy in Georgia (country)
1920s establishments in Georgia (country)
1929 establishments in the Soviet Union
Tourist attractions in Tbilisi